William (Bill) DeGrado (born 1955) is a professor at the University of California, San Francisco, where he is the Toby Herfindal Presidential Professor of Entrepreneurship and Innovation in the Department of Pharmaceutical Chemistry. As an early pioneer of protein design, he coined the term de novo protein design. He is also active in discovery of small molecule drugs for a variety of human diseases. He is a member of the U.S. National Academy of Sciences (1999), American Academy of Arts & Sciences (1997) and National Academy of Inventors. He also is a scientific cofounder of Pliant therapeutics.

Early life & Education 
Following high school graduation, DeGrado worked in a coat rack factory, an experience that motivated him to further his education. He attended colleges in the Chicago suburbs, while running a lawn-mowing service. About this time, his father, Jim DeGrado, designed the highly successful Red Solo Cup, while working as a commercial artist at Solo. In appreciation, Solo Cup offered DeGrado, a scholarship for the final two years of college, which DeGrado completed at Kalamazoo College.

DeGrado received his B.A. in chemistry from Kalamazoo College (1978) and a doctorate in organic chemistry from the University of Chicago (1981).

Industrial & Academic Career 
After receiving his PhD in organic chemistry from the University of Chicago (1981), DeGrado began work at DuPont as a research chemist, eventually becoming a senior director for small molecule therapeutics in DuPont Merck's Medicinal Chemistry Department. In 1995 he moved to the University of Pennsylvania, where he was a professor in the Biochemistry and Biophysics Department as well as an adjunct professor in the Department of Chemistry. Since 2011 he has been at the University of California, San Francisco School of Pharmacy, where he is the Toby Herfindal Presidential Professor of Entrepreneurship and Innovation. He is also a member of the Cardiovascular Research Institute and an adjunct member of the Institute for Neurodegenerative Diseases at UCSF.

Research 
Starting in the 1980's DeGrado's group developed the approach of de novo protein design, a term they coined to describe the design of proteins from first principles rather than through modification of natural protein sequences. They pioneered parametric approaches to the design of water-soluble 4-helix (alpha4) and 3-helix bundles (alpha3D), and ion channel peptides. The protein, alpha3D, was notable at the time, because it was the premier example of a de novo protein, which was biologically expressed, structurally validated, and whose sequence and structure were not based on the sequence or the precise tertiary structure of a natural protein. The sequence of alpha3D was designed using the computational sidechain repacking algorithms that had recently been developed by Ponders & Richards, Desjarlais & Handel, Dahiyat & Mayo. The folding kinetics of alpha3D are among the most extensively characterized of single-domain proteins, and it has been used as a template for design of metalloproteins. The company Arcellex used alpha3D as a starting point for design of chimeric antigen receptors (CARs). Clinical data announced in 2020 showed deep and durable responses of multiple myeloma, illustrating the potential of de novo proteins for treatment of human disease.

With Angela Lombardi (University of Naples), Les Dutton and Michael Therien (Duke University) DeGrado has also designed numerous proteins that mimic many of the catalytic and electron relay properties of heme and non-heme iron proteins, including a transmembrane protein capable of shuttling electrons across membranes. His group has also designed the first examples of de novo ion and proton channels.

Because the original approaches to de novo protein design focused on physical chemical principles it was easily extended to design biologically active polymers and foldamers (short homogeneous, sequence-specific polymers that fold into unique structures). This work led to the design of Brilacidin, which is currently in phase II clinical trials.

Contributions to Pharmaceutical Chemistry 
DeGrado contributed significantly to the development of Brilacidin, which is in clinical trials for several indications. DeGrado's group also has contributed to the development of small molecule antagonists of integrins that reached clinical trials. His work on this subject with Dean Sheppard also formed the basis for founding Pliant Pharmaceuticals, a company conducting clinical trials on idiopathic pulmonary fibrosis (IPF) and primary sclerosing cholangitis.

Awards
1988 Du Vigneaud Award for Young Investigators in Peptide Research
1989 Protein Society Young Investigator Award
1992 Eli Lilly Award in Biological Chemistry
1993 DuPont Merck Summit Award
1995 Fellow, American Association for the Advancement of Science
1998 Fellow, AAAS
1999 Member, National Academy of Sciences (U.S.A.)
2003 The American Peptide Society Merrifield Award
2008 The American Chemical Society Ralph F. Hirschmann Award in Peptide Chemistry
2009 The American Peptide Society Makineni Award
2015 The Stein & Moore Award of the Protein Society
2016 Weizmann Institute Max Perutz Memorial Lecture
2018 The American Chemical Society Cope Scholar Award
2018 The American Chemical Society Murray Goodman Memorial Prize
2020 The Franklin Institute & City Council of Philadelphia John C. Scott Award

References

External links
 Website of the DeGrado laboratory
 Search for publications from W.F. DeGrado on Pubmed

Year of birth missing (living people)
Living people
University of Pennsylvania faculty
Members of the United States National Academy of Sciences
American biochemists